Fan Chun Yip (born 1 May 1976) is a former Hong Kong professional footballer who played as a goalkeeper. He is currently the goalkeeping coach of Hong Kong Premier League club Southern.

Widely considered as one of the best goalkeepers in Hong Kong back in the days, he was voted as the Hong Kong Footballer of the Year in the 2003–04 season.

Childhood and early career
Fan was born in Hong Kong into a 7-member family. He is the youngest son. As a child, his 2nd oldest brother, who was tragically murdered in 2006, invited him to a 7 a-side match. Because he was the smallest, he was picked to be the goalkeeper. He surprised everyone with his agility and goalkeeping prowess, and even dived to save shots from the opponent on the hard concrete "pitch".
After this, Fan would regularly play in goal, which built his interest in football.

In 1985, Fan joined the Hong Kong football promotional program, and was picked for the Hong Kong Schools Sports Federation training team. This was the first step towards his illustrious football career.

After being picked for the Hong Kong Schools Sports Federation training team, Fan was picked to join the Hong Kong Sports Institute because his potential was recognised. From amateur, Fan was promoted to the junior team, then promoted to the youth team. Because of his average height, it was not easy for him to proceed and become the first choice keeper of the youth team.

After Fan's promotion to the youth team, he started off his 4-year long accommodated training.
Because Fan was professionally trained by the Hong Kong Sports Institute, he eventually was selected to represent the Hong Kong youth team.

Rangers is the First Division club Fan first joined. In a Reserve League match, he injured his index finger and was forced to rest for a couple of months. After recovering from this injury, he was named in the Hong Kong Olympic squad.

After a year at Rangers, he was loaned to Happy Valley. Happy Valley gave him the chance to make his debut, against his parent club, Rangers. Fan gained a lot of first-team experience with Happy Valley, although a hand injury kept him sidelined for two months. After this, he was released by Hong Kong Rangers.

In the two years after Fan's departure from Rangers, he joined Yee Hope and Instant-Dict. In the third year after Fan's joining to the club, he helped the club to win the Hong Kong FA Cup.Unfortunately, it was the last title for the club, as the sponsor left the club, forcing them to disband. On the night of 8 August 2003, Fan became nationally famous. There was an exhibition match against Spanish giants Real Madrid in the Hong Kong National Stadium. In the first half, the home team was down 4–2 due to the poor performance by the China goalkeeper An Qi. Fan came on as a substitute in the second half. He made a string of excellent saves to keep Real Madrid (with World Class players such as Beckham, Zidane, Raul and Ronaldo) at bay in the second half. After this 45-minutes, everyone in Hong Kong started to recognise and notice him.

Club career
On 17 November 2004, China played against Hong Kong in Guangzhou in a World Cup 2006 qualifying match. Fan performed numerous saves, and saved Zheng Zhi's crucial penalty kick. The save ended China's hope of reaching the 2006 tournament on goal difference, with Kuwait finishing above them in the group by virtue of one goal. After the match, the Mainland Chinese press named Fan 'The Bane of China', and Fan received some personal attack and threats; though fans of Hong Kong supported and honoured him as the Hero of Hong Kong, Pride of Hong Kong, etc. This has somewhat ironically led to his popularity in China, and Fan has attracted some Chinese clubs' interest.

In 2005, Chinese Super League team Changsha Ginde were interested in Fan and wanted to sign him from Happy Valley, and he verbally accepted the offer. The transfer was called off however, due to the sudden murder of his brother. Fan had no choice but had to stay in Hong Kong to take care of his family. In the meantime, he has promised that he will not join any team in the future except Changsha Ginde, and indicated that he will join them after the painful transition.

On 1 July 2007, a Reunification Cup was held in Hong Kong to celebrate the re-merging of Hong Kong with China anniversary. A China-Hong Kong XI (Chinese national team including six Hong Kong international players) played a World Star XI. Fan was given the captain's armband by the Chinese national team's head coach. He took part in the first half of the International exhibition match and again impressed highly. His excellence was acknowledged by the fans, who gave him an ovation and chanted his nickname Jyujai (豬仔; "Piggy").

Fan played for Shatin Sports Association in the Hong Kong First Division League. Before joining Shatin Sports Association, he played for Instant-Dict, Yee Hope, Rangers and Happy Valley. This was Fan's second spell with Happy Valley, having joined on loan some years previously. He made his international debut on 19 November 1998 against the Vietnam.

Fan made it into the Hong Kong league's Team of the Season four times consecutively between 2001 and 2005, and has been awarded the 'Hong Kong First Division League Most Popular Player' twice consecutively (2004–06).

International career
In 2005, Fan again impressed in his second appearance in the East Asian Cup, his excellent performances impressing foreign press and football fans alike. Indeed, he was eventually awarded the Best Goalkeeper of the tournament. Fan is now recognized as one of the best goalkeepers in Asia (along with the Japan National Yoshikatsu Kawaguchi and the R.O. Korean National Lee Woon-Jae).

On 6 September 2006, Hong Kong were playing against Uzbekistan in the Asian Cup Qualification Group stages. Fan was the star player for the Hong Kong, he consistently made excellent saves, infuriating the Uzbekistan's forwards, to the extent that one of them spat at him, though the matter was resolved. At last, Fan was noted the Man of the Match.

Managerial career
On 10 May 2020, it was reported that Fan would return to Pegasus as a goalkeeping coach after working at the club between 2015 and 2018.

Honours

Individual
Hong Kong Footballer of the Year: 2003–04

Career statistics

International
As of 19 November 2008

Personal life
Fan married when he was 23 and has a son named Fan Ki Chi(Kenji). He and his family now live in Kowloon Bay. He enjoys war game simulations with his teammates and friends during his leisure time. His most admired football players are Netherlands goalkeeper Edwin van der Sar and Italy's number one Gianluigi Buffon.

Fàn is a member of the Fàn family.

Fame beyond football
Fan is sponsored by Nike, with all his sportswear provided by the company. His goalkeeping gloves and boots are sewed with his initials on (C Y FAN).

Fan is also the spokesman for two companies, one for skincare and the other for ointment.

In 2005, Fan was invited to be the host for a Hong Kong TV program about sport.

Fan is now also an amateur football live commentator with IPTV's now TV.

Fan was invited to be a visitor in an Olympic related TV programme on TVB in 2008.

References

External links
 Fan Chun Yip – HKFA player profile
 Fan Chun Yip – Happy Valley player profile
 Hong Kong Athletes' Interviews – Fan Chun Yip
 My Football Dairy – Fan Chun Yip@sina.com 

1976 births
Living people
Hong Kong footballers
Hong Kong international footballers
Association football goalkeepers
Hong Kong Rangers FC players
Happy Valley AA players
Double Flower FA players
Shatin SA players
South China AA players
Yee Hope players
Hong Kong First Division League players
Footballers at the 1998 Asian Games
Footballers at the 2002 Asian Games
Footballers at the 2006 Asian Games
Asian Games competitors for Hong Kong
Hong Kong League XI representative players